Lophopoeum forsteri is a species of beetle in the family Cerambycidae. It was described by Tippmann in 1960.

References

Lophopoeum
Beetles described in 1960